The Ariari River is a river of Colombia, located entirely within the Meta Department. Part of the Orinoco River basin, it merges with the Guayabero River to forms the Guaviare River, one of the principle tributaries of the Orinoco.

See also
List of rivers of Colombia

References
Rand McNally, The New International Atlas, 1993.

Rivers of Colombia